Ed Vernon Hungerford III is an American physicist and one of the prominent international particle physicists. He is  one of the world leaders in the field of Hypernuclear Physics with significant original research carried out in the field. Since 2011, he is MD Anderson Professor of Physics at the Department of Physics, University of Houston, where he has been leading his research group (Medium-Energy Nuclear and Particle Physics group). He is known for his significant contributions to the field of hypernuclear physics and hypernuclear spectroscopy, with more than hundred important research papers, multiple grants and more than twenty successful PhD students advised during his highly-productive career.

Career
Hungerford has also held the position of the Chair of the Department of Physics, University of Houston, and has held membership or chair of a number of university and national committees. He started his academic career as a research scientist at the Oak Ridge National Laboratory and then as an assistant professor at the Physics Department, Rice University. He is also an acclaimed and popular teacher in physics, having been awarded with elected titles of the "Outstanding Educator of America", ”Top Professor” University of Houston and the ”Outstanding Professor of the Year” at University of Houston elected by students.

Hungerford, throughout his career, has worked on a series of important experiments at the Fermilab, Brookhaven National Laboratory, US Thomas Jefferson National Laboratory and Oak Ridge National Laboratory among other accelerators, and is currently involved with two international Dark Matter collaborations, the MAX  and DarkSide experiments.

Hungerford is a fellow of the American Physical Society and the American Association for Advancement of Science. He is a member of the American Association of Physics Teachers.

Personal life
Hungerford is married to Mary Hungerford and has a son and a daughter.

References

External links
 official website
 Hungerford
 papers

21st-century American physicists
Year of birth missing (living people)
Living people
Georgia Tech alumni
University of Houston faculty
Fellows of the American Physical Society